Down Three Dark Streets is a 1954 American film noir crime film directed by Arnold Laven and starring Broderick Crawford and Ruth Roman. The screenplay was written by Gordon Gordon and Mildred Gordon, based on their novel Case File FBI.

Plot
FBI agent John Ripley investigates the three cases his murdered partner Zack Stewart was working on, thinking that one of them may reveal the identity of Stewart's murderer.

One involves wanted fugitive Joe Walpo, who has killed a gas-station attendant. Another concerns a department store fashion buyer, Kate Martell, who is being extorted by a man threatening to kill her daughter. A third has to do with a gang of thugs who hijack cars.

Ripley and his new partner trail Connie Anderson, a girlfriend of Walpo's, to his hideout, where Ripley shoots him. They tie up the car-jacking case and are then able to narrow down who the killer of the FBI agent must be.

They follow Kate to the "Hollywood" sign in the hills above Los Angeles, where she has been told to bring the money. There the extortionist is revealed to be a man named Milson who had shown a romantic interest in Kate, leading to a confrontation with Ripley.

Cast
 Broderick Crawford as FBI Agent John Ripley
 Ruth Roman as Kate Martell
 Martha Hyer as Connie Anderson
 Marisa Pavan as Julie Angelino
 Max Showalter as Dave Milson (as Casey Adams)
 Kenneth Tobey as Zack Stewart
 Gene Reynolds as Vince Angelino
 William Johnstone as Frank Pace
 Harlan Warde as Greg Barker
 Jay Adler as Uncle Max
 Claude Akins as Matty Pavelich
 Suzanne Alexander as Brenda Ralles
 Myra Marsh as Mrs. Domes
 Joe Basselt as Joe Walpo
 William Schallert as murdered gas-station attendant (uncredited)

Production

Writing
J. Edgar Hoover objected to early drafts of the script.

References

External links
 
 
 
 
 

1954 films
Films based on American novels
Film noir
American crime films
1954 crime films
Films directed by Arnold Laven
Films produced by Edward Small
Films with screenplays by the Gordons
Films about the Federal Bureau of Investigation
Films scored by Paul Sawtell
1950s English-language films
American black-and-white films
1950s American films